The Wonderful World of Sam Cooke is a compilation album by American singer-songwriter Sam Cooke, released by Keen Records in October 1960.

Track listing

Side one 
 "Wonderful World" – 2:09
 "Desire Me" – 2:52
 "Summertime Part. 1" – 2:21
 "Almost in Your Arms" – 2:01
 "That's Heaven to Me" – 2:20
 "No One Can Take Your Place" – 2 :22

Side two
 "With You" – 2:34
 "Blue Moon" – 2:45
 "Stealing Kisses" – 2:09
 "You Were Made for Me" – 2:52
 "There! I've Said It Again" – 1:58
 "I Thank God" – 3:00

References

External links 
 Songs of Sam Cooke: Main Page

1960 albums
Sam Cooke albums
Keen Records albums